Ifalukellidae is a family of corals belonging to the order Alcyonacea.

Genera:
 Ifalukella Bayer, 1955
 Plumigorgia Nutting, 1910
 Speirogorgia Williams, 2019

References

Calcaxonia
Cnidarian families